Quentin Walker (born August 27, 1961) is a former American football running back who played for the St. Louis Cardinals of the National Football League (NFL) for one season. He played college football at Virginia.

A native of Teaneck, New Jersey, Walker played prep football at Teaneck High School, where he graduated in 1979.

College career
Walker played college football for the University of Virginia.

References

1961 births
Living people
American football running backs
Players of American football from New Jersey
Virginia Cavaliers football players
St. Louis Rams players
Sportspeople from Bergen County, New Jersey
Teaneck High School alumni